Endothenia is a genus of moths belonging to the subfamily Olethreutinae of the family Tortricidae.

Species
Endothenia affiliana McDunnough, 1942
Endothenia albolineana
Endothenia alpigena Bradley, 1965
Endothenia anthracana (Forbes, 1931)
Endothenia atrata (Caradja, 1926)
Endothenia austerana (Kennel, 1916)
Endothenia bacillata Diakonoff, 1973
Endothenia banausopis (Meyrick in Caradja & Meyrick, 1938)
Endothenia bira Kawabe, 1976
Endothenia citharistis (Meyrick, 1909)
Endothenia conditana (Walsingham, 1879)
Endothenia eidolon Razowski & Pelz, 2002
Endothenia engone Diakonoff, 1984
Endothenia ericetana (Humphreys & Westwood, 1845)
Endothenia euryteles (Meyrick, 1936)
Endothenia furvida Falkovitsh, 1970
Endothenia gentianaeana (Hubner, [1796-1799])
Endothenia hebesana (Walker, 1863)
Endothenia heinrichi McDunnough, 1929
Endothenia informalis (Meyrick, in Caradja & Meyrick, 1935)
Endothenia infuscata Heinrich, 1923
Endothenia ingrata Falkovitsh, 1970
Endothenia kostyuki Kuznetzov, 1994
Endothenia lapideana (Herrich-Schffer, 1851)
Endothenia limata Falkovitsh, 1962
Endothenia lutescens Diakonoff, 1973
Endothenia marginana (Haworth, [1811])
Endothenia melanosticta (Walsingham, 1895)
Endothenia menthivora (Oku, 1963)
Endothenia micans Diakonoff, 1973
Endothenia microptera Clarke, 1953
Endothenia mollisana (Walker, 1863)
Endothenia montanana (Kearfott, 1907)
Endothenia nephelopsycha (Meyrick, 1934)
Endothenia nigricostana (Haworth, [1811])
Endothenia nubilana (Clemens, 1865)
Endothenia oblongana (Haworth, [1811])
Endothenia pauperculana (Staudinger, 1859)
Endothenia polymetalla (Turner, 1916)
Endothenia pullana (Haworth, [1811])
Endothenia quadrimaculana (Haworth, [1811])
Endothenia remigera Falkovitsh, 1970
Endothenia rhachistis (Diakonoff, 1973)
Endothenia rubipunctana (Kearfott, 1907)
Endothenia sordulenta Heinrich, 1926
Endothenia sororiana (Herrich-Schffer, 1851)
Endothenia trizona Diakonoff, 1973
Endothenia ustulana (Haworth, [1811])
Endothenia vasculigera Meyrick, 1938
Endothenia villosula Falkovitsh, 1966

See also
List of Tortricidae genera

References

External links
tortricidae.com

Endotheniini
Tortricidae genera